George Moore (23 April 1871 – 20 June 1947) was a New Zealand Salvation Army officer and businessman. He was born in Brunnerton, West Coast, New Zealand on 23 April 1871.

References

1871 births
1947 deaths
New Zealand businesspeople